Suzy Records is a record label based in Zagreb, Croatia.

History
The company was established in the then Socialist Republic of Croatia in the Socialist Federal Republic of Yugoslavia in 1972.

After the abandonment of the socialist system and the subsequent breakup of Yugoslavia, during the 1990s the company transformed to SUZY d.o.o. (limited company). However, unlike its bigger competitors Jugoton and PGP-RTB which changed their names to Croatia Records and PGP-RTS respectively, Suzy continued to work under the same name. Several of its older important domestic titles were re-released in cooperation with another Croatian record label Hit Records during the 2000s.

Artists
The company is notable for releasing several prominent former Yugoslav pop and rock artists. Some of the artist that have been signed to Suzy, include:

Biseri
Boa
Buldožer
Zdravko Čolić
Drugi Način
Gori Uši Winnetou
Grupa 220
Grupa Marina Škrgatića
ITD Band
Metak
Parni Valjak
Prljavo Kazalište
Pro Arte
Tutti Frutti Balkan Band
Zvijezde

Like other former Yugoslav record labels, Suzy also released numerous foreign pop and rock albums for the domestic market including: AC/DC, Adam and the Ants, Blood, Sweat & Tears, Blue Öyster Cult, The Clash, Leonard Cohen, Phil Collins, Alice Cooper, Elvis Costello, Crosby, Stills, Nash & Young, The Doors, Bob Dylan, Europe, Fleetwood Mac, Aretha Franklin, Iron Butterfly, Michael Jackson, Judas Priest, Cyndi Lauper, Led Zeppelin, MC5, Midnight Oil, Prince, The Rolling Stones, Sade, Santana, Bob Seger, Paul Simon, Bruce Springsteen, Rod Stewart, Johnny Winter, Yes, and others. Suzy closely cooperated with many international  major labels such as CBS Records for instance.

Competition
Other major labels in the former Socialist Federal Republic of Yugoslavia were: PGP-RTB and Jugodisk from Belgrade, Jugoton from Zagreb, Diskoton, SarajevoDisk from Sarajevo, ZKP RTLJ and Helidon from Ljubljana and Maribor, respectively, Diskos from Aleksandrovac, and others.

Logos
From 1972, for this record label, there are three different logos. The first logo of the record label has been in use from 1972 to 1974, the second logo has been in use from 1974 to 1984, and the third and current logo is in use from 1984.

See also
List of record labels
Suzy Soft

References

External links
Official site

Croatian record labels
Yugoslav record labels
Yugoslav rock music
Record labels established in 1972
Companies based in Zagreb
State-owned record labels